Solidago ludoviciana, the Louisiana goldenrod, is a North American plant species in the family Asteraceae native to Louisiana, Texas and Arkansas. It can be found in dry open woods and along roadsides and other sunny, disturbed locations.

Solidago ludoviciana can be as tall as 150 cm (5 feet). It has round to elliptic leaves and open panicles of yellow flower heads. One plant can produce as many as 140 small heads

References

External links
Photo of herbarium specimen at Missouri Botanical Garden, collected in Texas in 1843

ludoviciana
Flora of Texas
Flora of Louisiana
Plants described in 1882
Flora of Arkansas